Abdul Waseem (born 6 October 1964) is a Pakistani politician who had been a member of the National Assembly of Pakistan, from 2008 to May 2018.

Early life
He was born on 6 October 1964.

Political career

He was elected to the National Assembly of Pakistan as a candidate of Muttahida Qaumi Movement (MQM) from Constituency NA-243 (Karachi-V) in 2008 Pakistani general election. He received 16,7764 votes and defeated Zafar Ahmed Siddiqui, a candidate of Pakistan Peoples Party (PPP).

He was re-elected to the National Assembly as a candidate of MQM from Constituency NA-243 (Karachi-V) in 2013 Pakistani general election. He received 192,638 votes and defeated Zahid Hussain Hashmi, a candidate of Pakistan Tehreek-e-Insaf (PTI).

References

Living people
Muttahida Qaumi Movement politicians
Pakistani MNAs 2013–2018
Politicians from Karachi
Pakistani MNAs 2008–2013
Place of birth missing (living people)
1964 births